Youth in the United States can be regarded as one age group in the demographics of the United States. In 2010 it was estimated that 20.2% of the population of the United States were 0–14 years old (30,305,704 females and 31,639,127 males).

Concerns from parents
According to a survey of parents in 2011, the issues of greatest concern about children are as follows, with percentages of adults who rate each item as a "big problem":
Childhood obesity: 33%
Drug abuse: 33%
Tobacco smoking: 25%
Teen pregnancy: 24%
Bullying: 24%
Internet safety: 23%
Stress: 22%
Alcohol abuse: 20%
Driving accidents: 20%
Sexting: 20%

Sexuality

Adolescent sexuality in the United States relates to the sexuality of American adolescents and its place in American society, both in terms of their feelings, behaviors and development and in terms of the response of the government, educators and interested groups.

Youth rights

The National Youth Rights Association is the primary youth rights organization in the United States, with local chapters across the country and constant media exposure. The organization known as Americans for a Society Free from Age Restrictions is also an important organization. The Freechild Project has gained a reputation for interjecting youth rights issues into organizations historically focused on youth development and youth service through their consulting and training activities. The Global Youth Action Network engages young people around the world in advocating for youth rights, and Peacefire provides technology-specific support for youth rights activists.

Choose Responsibility and their successor organization, the Amethyst Initiative, founded by Dr. John McCardell Jr., exist to promote the discussion of the drinking age, specifically. Choose Responsibility focuses on promoting a legal drinking age of 18, but includes provisions such as education and licensing. The Amethyst Initiative, a collaboration of college presidents and other educators, focuses on discussion and examination of the drinking age, with specific attention paid to the culture of alcohol as it exists on college campuses and the negative impact of the drinking age on alcohol education and responsible drinking.

Child support

Child labor

See also

Adolescent and young adult oncology
Demographics of the United States
Education in the United States
American family structure
Child poverty in the United States
Youth incarceration in the United States
Street children in the United States
Effect of World War I on children in the United States
Childhood obesity in the United States

Other countries:
 :Category:Youth by country

References

 
Demographics of the United States